Bang Khen District is a district of Bangkok, Thailand. 

Bang Khen may also refer to:
Bang Khen station of the State Railway of Thailand, in Chatuchak District, Bangkok
Bang Khen Subdistrict in Mueang Nonthaburi District, Nonthaburi Province
Talat Bang Khen Subdistrict in Lak Si District, Bangkok